Zona Rosa is an approximately , mixed-use lifestyle center located in Kansas City, Platte County, Missouri. The project opened in 2004 and was expanded by an additional  starting in 2008, including the addition of Dillard's, which moved from Metro North Mall. Zona Rosa was developed by Steiner+Associates, known for the Easton Town Center development in Columbus, Ohio.

See Also
 Bayshore
 The Greene Town Center 
 Liberty Center
 Easton Town Center

External links 
 Official Website

Economy of Kansas City, Missouri
Buildings and structures in Kansas City, Missouri
Shopping malls in Missouri
Shopping malls established in 2004
Buildings and structures in Platte County, Missouri
Tourist attractions in Kansas City, Missouri
2004 establishments in Missouri